A wheel chandelier is a lighting installment, in the form of a chandelier hanging from the ceiling in the form of a spoked wheel. The oldest and most important examples derive from the Romanesque period.

Wheel chandeliers were made for the practical purpose of lighting the great churches and other public areas, but in religion they also had symbolic significance, depicting the Garden of Eden or the Kingdom of God. The wheel, its gates, and its towers, which are usually decorated with Prophets and Apostles or inscribed with their names, symbolise the city walls of the New Jerusalem. The buttresses, towers, and candles number twelve or a multiple of twelve, after the numerology of the Book of Revelation. This symbolism is first found on two wheel chandeliers of Hildesheim Cathedral. The great wheel chandelier of the Church of the Holy Sepulchre was an inspiration.

Romanesque wheel chandeliers
In Germany there are four great Romanesque wheel chandeliers. The fact that they are made from fire-gilt copper and not from pure gold has saved them from being melted down. They were decorated with Prophets and angels in silver and with precious gemstones, but for the most part these have been lost.

The Barbarossa chandelier in Aachen Cathedral is attributed to Frederick Barbarossa (1122–1190).
Hartwig's chandelier in Comburg, Schwäbisch Hall, with a 5-metre diameter, from the 12th century (also called Himmlische Jerusalem(Heavenly Jerusalem)  with saints and soldiers in the towers.
Hezilo chandelier in Hildesheim Cathedral with a 6-metre diameter, a donation of Bishop Hezilo of Hildesheim (1054–79).
Azelin chandelier in Hildesheim Cathedral with a donation inscription of Bishop Thietmar of Hildesheim (1038–44).

Gothic wheel chandeliers
In the Minster Church of St. Alexander in Einbeck there is a later gothic wheel chandelier of painted brass with a diameter of c. 3.5 metres. The inscription on its bracket dates it to 1420. It was presumably gifted by Degenhard Ree, a canon of the collegiate church. The composition ought to go back to a lost example in Pöhlde Cloister.

Another Gothic example is found in:
The Cathedral of St. Stephan and St. Sixtus, in bronze, in Halberstadt (1516)

Neo-Romanesque wheel chandeliers

In some neo-Romanesque churches there are large wheel chandeliers too. Some of these were electric even when they were first installed
Some examples:
St. Godehard's Basilica in Hildesheim, gifted in 1864 by Marie of Saxe-Altenburg
St. Cäcilia in Harsum (c.1886)
Saint-Pierre-le-Jeune in Strasbourg (c.1890)
Bethlehemkirche in Hannover (c.1904)
St. Elisabeth in Bonn under contemporary frescoes in the dome (c. 1910) (electrified from installation)

Contemporary wheel chandeliers
There are also contemporary wheel chandeliers, which continue this tradition:
Herrenhäuser Kirche in Hannover (c. 1990)
Great St. Martin Church in Cologne (before 1993)

Wagon wheel
Another type is wagon wheel chandelier. As name suggest it is usually made from old wagon wheels. As opposite to most of the wheel chandeliers, wagon wheel chandeliers were usually created as a cheap way to lighten the common spaces of large houses, businesses and public halls. Most of them were made from wood reinforced with steel.

References

Bibliography 
 Hans Sedlmayr: Die Entstehung der Kathedrale. Zürich 1976. S. 125–130
 Clemens Bayer: Die beiden großen Inschriften des Barbarossa-Leuchters. In: Celica Jherusalem. Festschrift für Erich Stephany. Hrsg. Clemens Bayer. Köln 1986. S. 213–240
 Bernhard Gallistl: Bedeutung und Gebrauch der großen Lichterkrone im Hildesheimer Dom. In: Concilium Medii Aevi 12 (2009) S. 43–88 (PDF; 2,9 MB)
 Rolf Dieter Blumer, Ines Frontzek: Recherchiert und kartiert. Der Comburger Hertwig-Leuchter. In: Denkmalpflege in Baden-Württemberg, 41. Jahrgang 2012, Heft 4, S. 194–199 (PDF)

External links
Heziloleuchter im Hildesheimer Dom

Light fixtures
Christian religious furniture
Romanesque art
Medieval European metalwork objects